This is a list of the National Register of Historic Places listings in Voyageurs National Park.

This is intended to be a complete list of the properties and districts on the National Register of Historic Places in Voyageurs National Park, Minnesota, United States.  The locations of National Register properties and districts for which the latitude and longitude coordinates are included below, may be seen in an online map.

There are eleven properties and districts listed on the National Register in the park.

Current listings 

|--
|}

See also 
 National Register of Historic Places listings in St. Louis County, Minnesota
 National Register of Historic Places listings in Koochiching County, Minnesota
 National Register of Historic Places listings in Minnesota

References

External links

 Minnesota National Register Properties Database—Minnesota Historical Society
 Voyageurs National Park: Places–National Park Service
 Visitor Destinations–National Park Service